The 1993–94 season of the NOFV-Oberliga was the third and final season of the league at tier three (III) of the German football league system before the reintroduction of the Fußball-Regionalliga.

The NOFV-Oberliga was split into three divisions, NOFV-Oberliga Nord, NOFV-Oberliga Mitte and NOFV-Oberliga Süd. The champions of the Nord and Süd divisions entered into a play-off with the runners-up from Mitte, which FSV Zwickau won, and as such, were promoted to the 1994–95 2. Fußball-Bundesliga. The other two teams, plus the 14 clubs highlighted in light green and located with a "(Q)" in the tables below, became founding members of the newly introduced Regionalliga Nordost, together with FC Carl Zeiss Jena and Tennis Borussia Berlin who had been relegated from the 2. Bundesliga.

North

Central

South

2. Bundesliga play-off

External links 
 NOFV-Online – official website of the North-East German Football Association 

NOFV-Oberliga seasons
3
Germ